Gerald Locklin (February 17, 1941 –  January 17, 2021) was an American poet. He was a professor of English at California State University, Long Beach and the poetry editor of Chiron Review.

Biography
Locklin was born and raised in Rochester, New York. He received a bachelor’s degree from St. John Fisher College in 1961, an M.A. from the University of Arizona in 1963 and a Ph.D. from the institution in 1964.

He taught at Long Beach State from 1965 to 2007 and was also a part-time lecturer in the University of Southern California's Master of Professional Writing Program. From 1964 to 1965, he was an instructor at California State University, Los Angeles.

Locklin died from COVID-19 during the COVID-19 pandemic in California, exactly one month before his 80th birthday.

Friendship with Charles Bukowski
He was a friend of Charles Bukowski, whom he first met in 1970, when he arranged for Bukowski to give a reading at CSU, Long Beach. Whereas Bukowski was an avatar of the "Meat School" of poetry that flourished in the 1960s and '70s, Locklin was considered a "Stand-Up" poet. According to Locklin,  Charles Harper Webb defined "Stand-Up" poets as having "the qualities of directness, humor, pathos, performability, accessibility, [and] manliness...."

Despite being 20 years Bukowski's junior, they got along, even with the senior poet's aversion to "academics". 

Locklin wrote a memoir of that friendship, Charles  Bukowski: A Sure Bet, that was published in 1995.

Work
Locklin's first poem was published in Wormwood Review, which also published Bukowski. His first chapbook, Sunset Beach, was published in 1967. Locklin has published over 3,000 poems, works of fiction, reviews and articles that have appeared in numerous periodicals. He has published in excess of 125 books, chapbooks, and poetry broadsides.

References

External links
Rusty Truck: The Gerald Locklin Interview
Gerald Locklin: Official Website

American male poets
Poets from California
California State University, Long Beach faculty
1941 births
2021 deaths
20th-century American poets
20th-century American male writers
21st-century American poets
21st-century American male writers
Deaths from the COVID-19 pandemic in California